National Highway 69 (NH 69), (previously National Highway 206 (From Honnavara to Banavara section)  and National Highway 234 (From Huliyar to Mulbagal section)), is a major National Highway in India, that runs through the states of Karnataka and Andhra Pradesh. The western terminal is at the junction of NH 66 near Honnavar, connects NH 48 near Sira, connects NH 44 near Chikkaballapur, connects NH 75 near Mulbagal and terminates at the east end Chittoor. Its old name was NH 234.

Route 

It passes through Honnavar, Sagara, Shivamoga, Tarikere, Kadur, Banavara, Huliyar, Bukkapatna, Sira, Madhugiri, Gowribidanur, Chikkaballapur, Sidlaghatta, Chintamani, Srinivasapura, Mulbagal, Nangali in Karnataka and in Andhra Pradesh it passes through Palamaner, Chittoor.

Route length in states:

Andhra Pradesh –

See also 
 List of National Highways in India by highway number
 Ghat Roads
 National Highway 66 (India)
 National Highway 169 (India)
 National Highway 73 (India)
 National Highway 48 (India)
 National Highway 40 (India)

References

External links 

National highways in India
69
69